Taiaçu is a municipality in the state of São Paulo in Brazil. The population is 6,320 (2020 est.) in an area of 107 km². The elevation is 565 m.

References

Municipalities in São Paulo (state)